The biara (Rhaphiodon vulpinus) is a South American piscivorous fish in the dogtooth characin family. It belongs to the monotypic genus Rhaphiodon, although some minor differences in morphometrics and colour are known from across its large range. It is found in the Amazon, Orinoco, and Río de la Plata Basins, as well as rivers of the Guianas. It occurs in a wide range of freshwater habitats such as main river channels, flooded forests, lakes and reservoirs. Some populations are migratory.

Like other dogtooth characins, the biara has very long pointed canine teeth, but it is easily separated from its relatives by its very elongated and streamlined body shape.

Like its relatives, the biara feeds almost entirely on other fish, which are speared by the long canines. In a study of the stomach content of 100 biaras, the majority were empty. The remaining had prey fish that were 30–50% of the length of the biara itself, and only a single contained another prey type, a mayfly larvae.

In a study observing the reproductive biology of the biara species in the Tocantins River of Brazil, it was found that the prime reproductive period takes place in November. The high-water conditions of the environment correlate to the increase of reproductive rate.

The biara occasionally makes its way into the aquarium trade, but it requires a very large tank.

References 

Cynodontidae
Fish of South America
Taxa named by Johann Baptist von Spix
Taxa_named_by_Louis_Agassiz
Fish described in 1829